Glucagon/gastric inhibitory polypeptide/secretin/vasoactive intestinal peptide hormones are a family of evolutionarily related peptide hormones that regulate activity of G-protein-coupled receptors from the secretin receptor family.

A number of polypeptidic hormones, mainly expressed in the intestine or the pancreas, belong to a group of these structurally related peptides. One such hormone, glucagon, is widely distributed and produced in the alpha-cells of pancreatic islets. It affects glucose metabolism in the liver by inhibiting glycogen synthesis, stimulating glycogenolysis and enhancing gluconeogenesis. It also increases mobilisation of glucose, free fatty acids, and ketone bodies, which are metabolites produced in excess in diabetes mellitus. Glucagon is produced, like other peptide hormones, as part of a larger precursor (preproglucagon), which is cleaved to produce glucagon, glucagon-like protein I, glucagon-like protein II, and glicentin. The structure of glucagon itself is fully conserved in all mammalian species in which it has been studied. Other members of the structurally similar group include secretin, gastric inhibitory peptide, vasoactive intestinal peptide, prealbumin, peptide HI-27, and growth hormone releasing factor.

Human hormones from this family 
ADCYAP1;   GCG;       GHRH;      GIP;       SCT;       VIP;

References 

Protein domains
Peripheral membrane proteins
Peptide hormones
Hormones of the digestive system
Hormones of glucose metabolism